Jakub Grof (born May 16, 1981) is a Czech former professional ice hockey defenceman. He currently works as an assistant coach for HC Energie Karlovy Vary of the Czech Extraliga.

Grof played 186 games in the Czech Extraliga for HC Karlovy Vary and HC Zlín. He also played in the Elite.A for SG Cortina, the Austrian Hockey League for Orli Znojmo and the Polska Hokej Liga for GKS Katowice and JKH GKS Jastrzębie.

Grof played in the 2001 World Junior Ice Hockey Championships for the Czech Republic.

Career statistics

References

External links

1981 births
Living people
HC Baník Sokolov players
HC Berounští Medvědi players
SG Cortina players
Czech ice hockey coaches
Czech ice hockey defencemen
EHC Freiburg players
JKH GKS Jastrzębie players
Sportovní Klub Kadaň players
GKS Katowice (ice hockey) players
HC Karlovy Vary players
EV Landshut players
HC Most players
HC Olomouc players
Orli Znojmo players
Piráti Chomutov players
HC ZUBR Přerov players
HC Slovan Ústečtí Lvi players
Sportspeople from Karlovy Vary
PSG Berani Zlín players
Czech expatriate ice hockey players in Germany
Czech expatriate sportspeople in Italy
Czech expatriate sportspeople in Poland
Expatriate ice hockey players in Italy
Expatriate ice hockey players in Poland